Gourdon is a commune in the Alpes-Maritimes department in southeastern France. Gourdon offers panoramic views.

History and geography
In the distant past, this isolated rock was used as a place of refuge and defence. Gourdon, as it appears to us today, gives a good example of a Feudal village. It is built on a peak with impressive slopes down to the river Loup. There is only one entrance, from which you can access the main street. In former times, it was defended by a simple and harmonious Roman gate, that had been demolished at the beginning of the 20th century. Thick, high ramparts close off the North side, which is the only point from which the village can be approached.

Population

Tourism
The castle is one of Gourdon's most important features. It has been open to visitors since 1950, and was classed as an historical monument in 1971. Its magnificent gardens were designed by André Le Nôtre. Its architecture dates from the ninth century.

Filmography

Certain scenes of Les Misérables (2012) were filmed at Gourdon and in the surrounding area.

See also
Communes of the Alpes-Maritimes department

References

External links
 Gourdon Tourist Office

Communes of Alpes-Maritimes
Plus Beaux Villages de France
Alpes-Maritimes communes articles needing translation from French Wikipedia